Tom Aubrun is a French professional ice hockey goaltender who is currently an unrestricted free agent. He most recently played with the  Rockford IceHogs in the American Hockey League (AHL). He is the all-time NCAA record holder for consecutive shutouts.

Playing career
Aubrun spent most of his junior career playing for Rouen at various levels, but also made two appearances for the French national team at the World Junior Championships. He helped the U18 French team stave off relegation in 2013 and then turned in a one-game sub-par performance at the U20 tournament in 2014 but still managed to earn a bronze medal for the Division I B level.

Aubrun joined a powerhouse Division III program at Norwich in 2016. He played one period for the Cadets, stopping all three shots he faced, and was part of Mike McShane's 4th and final D-III championship. As a sophomore Aubrun started 9 games for Norwich as the primary backup and helped the team win its conference championship. Norwich fell to Hobart in the conference tournament and narrowly missed earning an at-large bid into the NCAA Tournament.

Beginning with his junior year, Aubrun was the starter and also began playing for a new head coach when Cam Ellsworth succeeded McShane. Aubrun was the star of the team, allowing 45 goals in 28 games as Norwich finished 2nd in the conference but won the tournament and earned an automatic bid to the 2019 NCAA Tournament. Aubrun backstopped Norwich to the championship game and kept the team in the contest against undefeated Wisconsin–Stevens Point but ultimately fell in overtime.

For his senior season, Aubrun began the season at a tremendous pace, earning shutouts in five of the first six games. After surrendering 3 goals to Massachusetts–Boston he came back to earth but continued to pile up wins as Norwich led the Division III national rankings. Beginning on January 25, Aubrun started another shutout streak and refused to allow anyone to score. In a stretch that included two nationally ranked teams, Aubrun broke the Division III NCAA record with his fifth consecutive shutout. A day later he recorded his sixth consecutive shoutout and surpassed Blaine Lacher as the all-time leader at any level of NCAA play. Even when the NEHC Tournament began Aubrun continued to refuse entry into his net and won all three games without surrendering a goal. His shutout streak ended only when the NCAA cancelled the 2020 Tournament due to the coronavirus pandemic. Aubrun's final record was 9 full games and 572:31 in game time.

Shortly after his college career was over, Aubrun received the Sid Watson Award as the national Division III player of the year. He then became just the third Norwich player in history to earn an AHL contract after finishing his college career when he signed with the Rockford IceHogs. Aubrun was in such rarified air during the season that he hired an agent around Christmas, which he was able to do as a non-scholarship player.

Career statistics

Regular season and playoffs

Awards and honors

References

External links

1995 births
Living people
French ice hockey goaltenders
French ice hockey people
Indy Fuel players
Norwich Cadets men's ice hockey players
People from Chamonix
Rockford IceHogs (AHL) players
Sportspeople from Haute-Savoie